Robert Reed (born November 14, 1939) is a former American football halfback who played college football for Pacific and professional football for, among others, the Minnesota Vikings (1962–1963) of the National Football League (NFL) and the Winnipeg Blue Bombers (1964) of the Canadian Football League (CFL).

Early years
A native of New Orleans, he attended Vallejo High School in Vallejo, California. He played college football at Solano Community College and the University of the Pacific in Stockton, California.

Professional football
He played professional football for the Minnesota Vikings during the 1962 and 1963 seasons, appearing in 16 NFL games. 

In 1964, he joined the Winnipeg Blue Bombers of the CFL. Winnipeg head coach Bud Grant said at the time, "He has done the 100 in 9.4. He can fly." He appeared in 10 games for Winnipeg during the 1964 season, totaling 307 rushing yards, 249 receiving yards, and 487 kickoff return yards for Winnipeg.

Reed also played several years in the Continental Football League (1965–1967) and the Atlantic Coast Football League (1969–1970).

References

1939 births
Living people
American football halfbacks
Minnesota Vikings players
Winnipeg Blue Bombers players
Pacific Tigers football players
Players of American football from New Orleans